Marco Barbarigo (c. 1413 – August 14, 1486) was the 73rd Doge of Venice from 1485 until 1486. His nomination took place on a new staircase in the courtyard of the Doge's Palace, on an axis with the Campanile of St. Mark and the Porta della Carta.

Barbarigo was elected as Doge of Venice in September 1485 to succeed Doge Giovanni Mocenigo, who was possibly poisoned. Marco died in August 1486, less than a year after becoming Doge, probably in a violent dispute between nobles caused by his brother Agostino. He was succeeded as Doge by Agostino Barbarigo, who was Procurator while Marco was Doge, from 1486 until 1501.

Family 
His dogaressa was Lucia Ruzzini (d. 1496), described as a hypochondriac but talented beauty. His father was Francesco Barbarigo and his brother was Agostino Barbarigo. He and his brother are the namesakes of the Master of the Barbarigo Reliefs, who was responsible for the creation of their tomb.

Popular culture
Marco Barbarigo appears in the video game Assassin's Creed II as a villain, and one of the main character's assassination targets. Barbarigo is depicted as being a puppet of the Knights Templar Grand Master Rodrigo Borgia, and his ally, the fictional Council of Ten member Carlo Grimaldi, who kills Doge Giovanni Mocenigo to allow Barbarigo to become the next Doge and take over Venice for the Templars. Barbarigo is killed by a member of the rival Assassin Order, Ezio Auditore da Firenze, with a hidden gun while holding a speech on a boat during Carnevale.

References

External links 

Panegyric on Doge Marco Barbarigo at British Library

Bibliography 

 
 
 

1413 births
1486 deaths
15th-century Doges of Venice
Marco